The 1984 Australian Touring Car Championship was a CAMS sanctioned Australian motor racing title for Group C Touring Cars. It was the 25th running of the Australian Touring Car Championship, and the last to be contested by Group C cars as new regulations, based on international Group A, were introduced for 1985. The championship, which began on 18 February 1984 at Sandown Raceway and ended on 1 July at Adelaide International Raceway after seven rounds, was won by Dick Johnson driving a Ford XE Falcon.

Season Summary
Johnson's win gave Ford and its Falcon both the first and last ATCC wins under Group C regulations as Allan Moffat won the 1973 ATCC in a Falcon XY GTHO Phase III. The win was also Ford's 12th ATCC win since the championship began in 1960 and the Falcon's 6th win overall after having previously won in 1973, 1976, 1977 (all Moffat), 1981 and 1982 (both Johnson). Given that a Falcon did not contest the championship from 1985 to 1992, it was also the last championship win for a Falcon driver until 1993.

1984 saw the first ever ATCC race win by a turbocharged car when George Fury won the 6th round at a wet Lakeside Raceway just north of Brisbane driving a Nissan Bluebird Turbo.

Peter Brock, driving a Marlboro Holden Dealer Team entered Holden Commodore, was the only driver to win more than once, with victories in the opening rounds at Sandown and Symmons Plains. Johnson's only win in the series was at the 4th round at Surfers Paradise, though he never finished lower than 3rd in any other round. Allan Grice won the last round at Adelaide (his last ever ATCC race win), and thus the distinction of winning the last ATCC race run under Group C rules. Defending champion Allan Moffat only won one round of the series, at Wanneroo Park, and suffered a crash at Surfers Paradise in which he not only wrote off his Mazda RX-7, but also broke bones in his right hand and suffered a fractured sternum, forcing him out of the series (in fact, Moffat would not appear in another ATCC race until round 4 of the 1988 series at Wanneroo). The only other winner was former champion Bob Morris who introduced some flavour to the series when he made a comeback to the sport in 1984, winning Round 5 at Oran Park in an RX-7 fitted with a standard gearbox after the team's only race unit was broken in practice. Holden Commodore driver Warren Cullen finished 4th in the championship and was the only driver other than Dick Johnson to finish every round of the series.

Unfortunately for the final ATCC run under the local Group C rules, with the exception of Dick Johnson, Jim Richards contesting his first ATCC in his JPS Team BMW 635 CSi, Warren Cullen's two car Commodore team backed by K-Mart with new teammate Andrew Harris in his 1982 and 1983 Bathurst winning ex-HDT Commodore, and 1983 Australian Endurance Champion Peter McLeod in his Slick 50 Mazda RX-7, the series was devoid of many of its big name drivers from mid-season. Peter Brock missed both Queensland rounds due to his commitment to race a Porsche 956 with his Bathurst winning co-driver Larry Perkins at the 1000 km of Silverstone and 24 Hours of Le Mans races and was substituted in both races by teammate John Harvey having his first ATCC drive since 1979. After the Roadways Racing team lost their STP sponsorship (though still running a single car for Steve Harrington), Allan Grice struggled to find enough sponsorship other than SAAS Wheels to run his rented Roadways Commodore for the entire series and missed most of the mid-season rounds, during which time he drove the ex-Bob Jane DeKon Chevrolet Monza (now owned by Re-Car's Allan Browne) on his way to winning the Australian GT Championship, and he also drove at Le Mans in a Porsche 956 (he also joined the television commentary team for Surfers Paradise). George Fury was also missing mid-season when Nissan team boss Howard Marsden decided to concentrate on car development following a couple of non-finishes, while reigning champion Moffat missed the last three rounds of the series through injury.

The 1984 ATCC saw the ABC televise each round of the series live throughout Australia. It was the first time that one television station had covered the entire series, previously the ABC and Channel 7 had shared the broadcast rights. It would be the last time the ABC covered the ATCC as Seven took over from 1985 when the locally developed Group C rules were replaced by the FIA's International Group A touring car regulations. The commentators for the ABC telecasts were Will Hagon and John Smailes with Tim Lane, Neil Crompton, Bob Vincent, Bob Morris and Allan Grice joining them at selected rounds.

Teams and drivers
The following teams and drivers competed in the 1984 Australian Touring Car Championship.

Race calendar
The 1984 Australian Touring Car Championship was contested over a seven-round series with one race per round.

Points system
Cars competed in two engine displacement classes, "up to and including 3000cc" and "3001-6000cc".

Points were awarded for the first twenty outright places in each round using a two tier system as shown in the following table.

3001-6000cc consisted of BMW 635 CSi, Chevrolet Camaro Z28, Ford XD Falcon, Ford XE Falcon, Holden VH Commodore, Mazda RX-7 and Nissan Bluebird Turbo.

Up to and including 3000cc consisted of Ford Capri Mk.III, Ford Escort Mk.II, Isuzu Gemini, Mazda 323, Mazda 626, Mitsubishi Colt, Toyota Celica and Triumph Dolomite Sprint

Points from the best six round results only could be retained by each driver.

Championship results

References

External links
1984 Australian Touring Car racing images at www.autopics.com.au

Australian Touring Car Championship seasons
Touring Cars